The American Breed was an American rock band from Chicago in the 1960s. The band was originally called Gary & The Knight Lites before adopting the name The American Breed in 1967. The band had a number of charting songs in  1967–68, the best-known of which was "Bend Me, Shape Me". The band broke up in 1970, and members went on to form Rufus after the split.

History
The American Breed originated as a group formed in 1961 by Gary Loizzo in Cicero, Illinois, United States, called Gary & The Knight Lites.  Gary & The Knight Lites was influenced by The Everly Brothers and rhythm & blues songs, and they were joined in their first recording session by Charles "Chuck" Colbert whose father owned the recording studio. Songs they recorded included "I'm Glad She's Mine", and "Will You Go Steady". Other releases included "I Don't Need Your Help" and "I Can't Love You Anymore", also they also recorded "One, Two, Boogaloo" as The Light Nites. They recorded until 1966 before becoming The American Breed. The members of the group included Gary Loizzo (vocals and guitar), Charles "Chuck" Colbert, Jr. (bass guitar and vocals), Al Ciner (guitar and vocals), and Jim Michalak (drums).

On January 20, 1967, a freak snow storm that dumped twenty inches on Chicago changed the fate of Gary & The Knight Lites when Kenny Myers, former Senior Vice President of Mercury Records, found himself stranded and met with Producer Bill Traut in his studio at Universal Recording. After Traut played Meyers some of the band's tapes, Meyers was impressed enough to sign them to his new record label, Acta (a subsidiary of Dot Records, itself owned by Paramount Pictures, whose record holdings later evolved into the Famous Music Group) and suggested they change their name. "They told us Gary and the Knight Lites sounded a little dated", Loizzo told Chicago Tribune in 1994. "So we put a bunch of names in a hat and pulled out American Breed". The band's first single was "Ï Don't Think You Know Me", written by Carole King and Gerry Goffin.

The American Breed enjoyed its greatest success in 1967 and 1968, when five of their singles reached the charts. The first to chart was "Step Out of Your Mind", which reached No. 24 in Billboard Hot 100 in July 1967. The success allowed the group, originally signed for singles, to make albums and quit their daytime gigs to pursue music full-time.  The band's biggest success was "Bend Me, Shape Me", which reached No. 5 on the U.S. Billboard Hot 100 chart in 1968. The song, written by Scott English and Larry Weiss, had previously been recorded by an all-female band known as the Models and had been a hit on the UK Singles Chart for the British group Amen Corner. It had also been recorded by The Outsiders after they had reached the top ten with "Time Won't Let Me" in 1966. Contributing to the success of the American Breed's version of "Bend Me, Shape Me" was the arrangement of the song by the band's record producer, Bill Traut, who added horns among other changes. The group also appeared on the 16 December 1967 episode of the television show American Bandstand, along with Pink Floyd. The song sold over one million copies and was awarded a gold disc. The song also peaked at No. 24 in the UK Singles Chart, and No. 9 in the German charts.  Other hit songs included "Green Light".

The band also found themselves in high demand in the lucrative radio jingles market, recording commercials for Coca-Cola, the United States Navy, and Bell Telephone, among others. Their television commercial for American Airlines ("Fly the American Way") was also a big success in the top twenty TV markets and their songs were also featured on the soundtrack to the films No Way to Treat a Lady (1968) and The Brain (1969).

In 1968, the band appeared three times on American Bandstand and later that same year, Kevin Murphy joined as keyboardist and the band briefly altered the name to "THE American BREED" before shortening to "The Breed". Their next single, "Keep the Faith", failed to make the charts and singer Paulette McWilliams was added in 1969 in a move towards a more R&B funk sound on their next single "Hunky Funky", which "bubbled under" at No. 107. But the band was for all intents and purposes finished by then, though Loizzo briefly tried to keep the name afloat in 1970 with one last single, "Can't Make it Without You", which went nowhere.

Loizzo went on to open his own recording studio, "Pumpkin", where he worked on producing commercials and other groups, eventually receiving a Grammy nomination for his work with Styx. Colbert, Graziano, McWilliams, and Murphy (after a brief stint in the military) regrouped as "Smoke" and then "Äsk Rufus" (the name soon abbreviated to Rufus). McWilliams was later replaced by Chaka Khan and the band later scored their first Top 10 hit under the Rufus name with "Tell Me Something Good" in 1974.

The four members of "The American Breed" (Ciner, Loizzo, Colbert, and Graziano) briefly reunited in 1986 and recorded the album Once Again, featuring a new version of "Bend Me, Shape Me".

A compilation album, Bend Me, Shape Me: The Best of the American Breed, was released in 1994. "Bend Me, Shape Me" continues to receive airplay on oldies radio stations.

Since that first regrouping in 1986, the band has continued to make periodic reunion appearances at shows and fairs, mostly in and around their native Chicago.

Their lead singer, Gary Loizzo, died of pancreatic cancer on January 16, 2016, aged 70.

Personnel
Gary Loizzo – vocals, guitar (August 16, 1945 – January 16, 2016)
Al Ciner – guitar, vocals (born May 14, 1947, Chicago)
Charles "Chuck" Colbert – bass, vocals (born August 30, 1939, Chicago)
Jim Michalak – drums {"Gary & The Knight Lites"} (October 29, 1941 – December 21, 2017) 
Lee Graziano – {"The American Breed"} drums, trumpet, vocals (born November 9, 1943, Chicago)
Kevin Murphy - keyboards

Discography

Albums

Singles

References

External links
The Official "The American Breed" website
The American Breed web site
Acta records history including The American Breed [Not found 2018.01.25]

Musical groups established in 1966
Musical groups disestablished in 1969
Rock music groups from Illinois
Musical groups from Chicago
Dot Records artists
1966 establishments in Illinois